The Springbok is a greyhound racing competition held annually at Central Park Stadium. 

It was inaugurated in 1937  at the White City Stadium in London and was held there until its closure in 1985 when it switched to Wimbledon Stadium. The event is the leading competition for novice hurdlers. 

In 2017 the race switched to Central Park Stadium in Sittingbourne following the closure of Wimbledon Stadium. The relocation of the competition to Central Park continued a family legacy for the Cearns family who had been connected with the race when it was first held in 1937.

Past winners

Venues & Distances
1937–1985 (White City (London), 550y hurdles) 
1986–2010 (Wimbledon, 460m hurdles) 
2011–2016 (Wimbledon, 480m hurdles)
2017–present (Central Park, 480m hurdles)

Sponsors
1994–1995 (John Henwood)
2000–2006 (William Hill)
2007–2007 (Betfair)
2008–2009 (Stan James Bookmakers)
2010–2016 (William Hill)
2017–2021 (Cearnsport)
2022–present (Arena Racing Company)

References

Greyhound racing competitions in the United Kingdom
Sport in Sittingbourne
Recurring sporting events established in 1937